La traduction et la lettre ou l'auberge du lointain is a book by Antoine Berman, published in 1991.

References

1991 non-fiction books
Translation studies
Translation publications
French-language books